Kwong Wah Hospital is a 1,141-bed Charitable district general hospital in Yau Ma Tei, Hong Kong. Located on 25 Waterloo Road, the main hospital was founded by the Tung Wah Group in 1911, and managed by the Hospital Authority since 1991. It provides a full range of medical services to the population of West Kowloon and Wong Tai Sin. It is Kowloon West Cluster's major acute teaching hospital, and also a Neurosurgical and Antenatal Diagnosis referral centre. The Hospital has established various clinical centers, including Lai Kwok Wing Urology Centre, Minimally Invasive Surgery Training Centre and Chan Feng Men Ling Cardiac Centre. There are integrated Breast Centre and Dr Stephen Chow Chun-kay Assisted Reproduction Centre. It has established a Community Based Geriatric Service, Respiratory Care Unit, Acute Stroke Unit, TWGHs BOCHK Diabetes Centre, Wong Wha San Renal Memorial Centre, and a Nuclear Medicine site. Kwong Wah Hospital is also a pioneer in Integrative Chinese and Western Medicine. TWGHs (Tung Wah Group of Hospitals) has established TWGHs Wilson T S Wang Integrated Chinese and Western Medicine Treatment Centre in Kwong Wah. The hospital has participated through joint consultation for designated diseases under protocols which developed by both Chinese Medicine and Western Medicine practitioners.

The former Main Hall Building of Kwong Wah Hospital is preserved and houses the Tung Wah Group of Hospitals Museum.

History
Since 1898, after the lease of the New Territories and its incorporation into British Hong Kong, the Han Chinese population living in Kowloon increased rapidly. However, there were no hospitals in Kowloon or the New Territories, patients who require hospital care would have to ferry across to Hong Kong Island. Chinese philanthropists and physicians, led by Kai Ho, proposed the establishment of a charitable hospital to serve the growing Chinese population in the Kowloon area; the hospital's name (Kwong Wah, Guangdong Han Chinese) reflects its mission. The Hong Kong government eventually took up the proposal in 1907 and contributed $139,340 (equivalent to approximately $6 million HKD today) over five years, with the assistance of local charitable organizations, to finish construction of the hospital. The opening ceremony occurred in October 1911. Kwong Wah Hospital was managed by the board of directors of the Tung Wah Hospital.
 
At the time, much of the Chinese population was skeptical of Western medicine and some even refused Western treatment on their deathbeds; however, the repeated invasion of the bubonic plague due to globalized trade meant that the Hong Kong government and local physicians were acutely aware of the need to introduce modern Western medicine to the wider population. The Tung Wah hospitals attempted a compromise of adapting from the scientific knowledge and effective methods of Western medicine while also providing traditional Chinese medical care, often as a form of placebo. In 1922, local philanthropists donated $50,580 HKD (equivalent to approximately $2 million HKD today) to set up a specialist Chinese medicine clinic at the Kwong Wah Hospital. Integrated Chinese medical treatment continue to be available to this day.

Like its sister hospital the Tung Wah Hospital, the hospital initially relied on support from local charitable organizations, providing medicine and medical services free of charge to local residents. The hospital ran into funding shortages in its early days due to the relatively low number of wealthy citizens living in the Kowloon area, in contrast to Hong Kong Island. In 1928, local Chinese leaders convinced the Yau Ma Tei Tin Hau Temple, at the time another important local charity, to transfer its assets to the Kwong Wah Hospital. 
In 1931, the three hospitals managed separately by the board of the Tung Wah Hospital were reorganized into the Tung Wah Group of Hospitals. 
With the rapid development of Kowloon after World War II, funding from both local charities and the government has increased significantly, and the hospital has experienced over a dozen reconstruction and expansion projects, developing from a single building of 72 beds initially to its modern-day complex of seven towers with several thousand hospital beds.

The hospital played a major role in the SARS epidemic which made its way from Guangdong province to Hong Kong early in 2003. On 21 February, Liu Jianlun, a 64-year-old Chinese doctor who had treated cases of SARS in Guangdong arrived in Hong Kong to attend a wedding. He checked into the Metropole Hotel (the ninth floor - room 911). Although he had developed symptoms on 15 February, he felt well enough to travel, shop, and sight-see with his brother-in-law. On 22 February he sought urgent care at the Kwong Wah Hospital and was admitted to the intensive care unit. He died on 4 March. About 80% of the Hong Kong cases have been traced back to this doctor. On 25 February, the 53-year-old brother-in-law of the Guangdong doctor came to the Kwong Wah Hospital. He was not admitted that day but his illness worsened, and he was admitted on 1 March. He died on 19 March.

Scope of services
24-Hour Accident and Emergency Service

Specialties
Medicine and Geriatrics
Surgery
Neurosurgery
Obstetrics and Gynaecology
Paediatrics
Orthopaedics and Traumatology
Anaesthesia & Operating Theatre Services
Pathology
Diagnostic Radiology
Liaison Psychiatry
Ear, Nose and Throat (ENT)
Inpatient Ophthalmology
Inpatient Dentistry

Ambulatory and Allied Health

General Out-Patient Service
Specialist Out-Patient Service
Pharmacy
Physiotherapy
Occupational Therapy
Medical Social Service
Prosthetics and Orthotics
Dietetics
Podiatry
Clinical Psychology
Speech Therapy

Community Services
Community Nursing
Community Geriatric Assessment Team
Well Women Clinic(provided by TWGHs))
TWGHs Integrated Diagnostic & Medical Centre(provided by TWGHs)
Chinese Medicine Clinics(provided by TWGHs)

Others
Central Sterile Supplies Department
Electrodiagnostic Unit
Endoscopy Unit
Day Surgery
Prenatal Diagnostic Centre
Intensive Care Unit (ICU)
Neurosurgical High Dependency Unit
Geriatric Day Hospital
Renal Dialysis Service

Integrative Chinese and Western Medicine 
Kwong Wah Hospital is also provides integrative traditional Chinese medicine (TCM) and Western Medicine. TWGHs Wilson T S Wang Integrated Chinese and Western Medicine Treatment Centre was established by the TWGHs in Kwong Wah Hospital . Through joint consultation for designated diseases under protocols which developed by both Chinese Medicine and Western Medicine practitioners.

Notable people
 Ma Ying-jeou, the former President of the Republic of China, was born in this hospital in 1950. This information is displayed in the Museum of the Hospital.
 Sita Chan, singer who died in a car accident.

Transportation
MTR Kwun Tong line and Tsuen Wan line Yau Ma Tei station Exit A2.

References

External links

Hospital buildings completed in 1911
Hospitals established in 1911
Tung Wah Group of Hospitals
Yau Ma Tei
1911 establishments in Hong Kong